Basically Duke is an album by bassist/cellist and composer Oscar Pettiford which was recorded in 1954 and first issued on the Bethlehem label as a 10-inch LP.

Reception

The Allmusic site awarded the album 4 stars.

Track listing 
All compositions by Oscar Pettiford except where noted.
 "Jack the Bear" (Duke Ellington) - 3:15
 "Tamalpais" - 3:33
 "Swing Until the Girls Come Home" - 3:54
 "Mood Indigo" (Ellington, Barney Bigard, Irving Mills) - 2:56
 "Chuckles" (Clark Terry) - 2:42
 "Time on My Hands" (Vincent Youmans, Harold Adamson, Mack Gordon) - 3:10

Personnel 
Oscar Pettiford - bass, cello
Clark Terry, Joe Wilder - trumpet
Jimmy Cleveland - trombone
Jimmy Hamilton - clarinet, tenor saxophone
Dave Schildkraut - alto saxophone
Danny Bank - baritone saxophone
Earl Knight - piano
Osie Johnson- drums

References 

Oscar Pettiford albums
1954 albums
Bethlehem Records albums